Bobby Wuensch (born November 1, 1947) is a former American football offensive lineman. He played for the Texas Longhorns, anchoring their best offensive line in 1968–1970 as a consensus All-American. Wuensch was a captain of the National Champion 1969 Texas Longhorns football team.

Wuensch was selected by the Baltimore Colts in the 12th round, 294th overall, in the 1971 NFL Draft, but never played in the NFL.

References

External links 
Texas Longhorns bio

1949 births
Living people
Players of American football from Houston
American football offensive linemen
Texas Longhorns football players